Aaron David Meldola de Sola (22 November 1853 – 29 April 1918) was the first native-born Canadian rabbi. He succeeded his father Abraham de Sola as leader of the Shearith Israel synagogue in Montreal upon the latter's death in 1882.

Biography

Meldola de Sola was born in Montreal in 1853, the eldest son of Esther and Rabbi Abraham de Sola. His rabbinical studies were pursued chiefly under the direction of his father, whose assistant he became in 1876. He was elected as his father's successor in 1882. On a number of occasions he was invited to deliver sermons at the Congregation Shearith Israel in New York and Bevis Marks Synagogue in London.

He was appointed the first vice-president of the Orthodox Convention in New York in 1898, and he was one of the committee of three that drew up its "Declaration of Principles." At the conventions held in 1900 and 1903 he was elected first vice-president of the Union of Orthodox Jewish Congregations of the United States and Canada, and chairman of the Committee on Presentations of Judaism.

De Sola published a large number of pamphlets on Jewish subjects, as well as articles in newspapers and magazines. He wrote voluminously in the Jewish press in defense of Orthodox Judaism, and was a vocal critic of the Reform movement. In 1902 he issued a protest against the Central Conference of American Rabbis for discussing the transfer of the Sabbath to the first day of the week. De Sola was also outspoken against Christian missionary activities, and a strong supporter of the Zionist movement.

Personal life
On 3 August 1887 de Sola married Katherine (Katie) Samuel, daughter of the Rev. Isaac Samuel, long-time ḥazzan of the Bayswater Synagogue in London. She would go on to serve as President of the Montreal branch of the National Council of Jewish Women, and Vice-President and Treasurer of the Montreal branch of the National Council of Women of Canada. Together they had two children, Abraham (Bram) Charles and Elizabeth Louisa.

Publications

References
 

1853 births
1918 deaths
19th-century Sephardi Jews
Anglophone Quebec people
Canadian Orthodox rabbis
Canadian Zionists
Clergy from Montreal
Sephardi rabbis
Spanish and Portuguese Jews
19th-century Canadian Jews